Charles H. Hodgins (born circa 1880) was a rugby union player who represented Australia.

Hodgins, a fly-half, claimed a total of 3 international rugby caps for Australia.

References

                   

Australian rugby union players
Australia international rugby union players
Year of birth uncertain
Year of death missing
Rugby union fly-halves